Craig Heller may refer to:

 Craig Heller (physiologist), physiologist and biologist at Stanford University
 Craig Heller (writer), American television soap opera script writer